John Halkett may refer to:

Sir John Halkett, 4th Baronet (1720–1793), of the Halkett baronets
John Halkett (colonial administrator) (1768–1852), governor of the Bahamas and Tobago
Sir John Halkett, 7th Baronet (1805–1847), son of Sir Peter Halkett, 6th Baronet
John Halkett (footballer), Scottish footballer